This is a list of the marine Mollusca Bivalvia recorded from Ireland. It is part of the List of marine molluscs of Ireland.
The list includes species from the Continental Margin Zone (200 - 500m); Bathyal (500 - 2000m); Abyssal Rise (2000 - 4000m) ; Rockall Basin and Porcupine Seabight, Celtic Sea,

Taxonomy - Taxonomy of the Bivalvia (Bouchet, Rocroi, Bieler, Carter & Coan, 2010)

CLASS BIVALVIA LINNAEUS, 1758

SUBCLASS PROTOBRANCHIA

Order Nuculoida Dall, 1889

Superfamily Nuculoidea J. E. Gray, 1824 
Images at Bold
Images at EOL
Family Nuculidae J. E. Gray, 1824
Brevinucula verrilli (Dall, 1886) 
Ennucula corbuloides  (Seguenza, 1877) 
Ennucula granulosa  (Verrill, 1884) 
Ennucula tenuis  (Montagu, 1808) 
Nucula atacellana  Schenck, 1939 
Nucula hanleyi  Winckworth, 1931 
Nucula nitidosa  Winckworth, 1930 
Nucula nucleus  (Linnaeus, 1758) 
Nucula sulcata  Bronn, 1831 
Nucula tumidula  Malm, 1861 
Superfamily Pristiglomoidea Sanders & Allen, 1973
Family Pristiglomidae Sanders & Allen, 1973
Pristigloma alba (Sanders & Allen, 1973) 
Pristigloma nitens (Jeffreys, 1876) 
Order Nuculanoida Carter, Campbell & Campbell, 2000

Superfamily Nuculanoidea H. Adams & A. Adams, 1858
Family Nuculanidae H. Adams & A. Adams, 1858 pars Yoldiidae
Ledella messanensis (Jeffreys, 1870) 
Ledella pustulosa (Jeffreys, 1876) 
Ledella ultima (E A Smith, 1885) 
Microgloma pusilla (Jeffreys, 1879) 
Microgloma tumidula (Monterosato, 1880) 
Nuculana minuta (Müller, 1776) 
Nuculana pernula (Müller, 1779) 
Yoldiella curta Verrill & Bush, 1898 
Yoldiella fabula Allen, Sanders & Hannah, 1995 
Yoldiella incala Allen, Sanders & Hannah, 1995 
Yoldiella insculpta (Jeffreys, 1879) 
Yoldiella jeffreysi (Hidalgo, 1877) 
Yoldiella lucida (Lovén, 1846) 
Yoldiella nana (M Sars, 1865) 
Yoldiella philippiana (Nyst, 1844) 
Yoldiella thaerella Killeen & Turner, 2009 
Yoldiella valorousae Killeen & Turner, 2009 
Family Malletiidae H. Adams & A. Adams, 1858
Katadesmia cuneata (Jeffreys, 1876) 
Malletia johnsoni Clark, 1961 
Family Neilonellidae Schileyko, 1989 
Neilonella latior (Jeffreys, 1876) 
Family Siliculidae Allen & Sanders, 1973 
Silicula fragilis Jeffreys, 1879 
Family Bathyspinulidae Coan & Scott, 1997
Bathyspinula subexcisa (Dautzenberg & Fischer, 1897) 
Bathyspinula filatovae (Knudsen 1967) 
Family Lametilidae Allen & Sanders, 1973 
Lametila abyssorum Allen & Sanders, 1973

AUTOLAMELLIBRANCHIATA Grobben, 1894

SUBCLASS PTERIOMORPHA Beurlen, 1944

Order Arcoida Stoliczka, 1870

Superfamily Arcoidea Lamarck, 1809

Family Arcidae Lamarck, 1809 
Arca tetragona Poli, 1795 
Asperarca nodulosa (Müller, 1776) 
Bathyarca inaequisculpta (E A Smith, 1885) 
Bathyarca pectunculoides (Scacchi, 1835) 
Bathyarca philippiana (Nyst, 1848) 
Bentharca asperula (Dall 1881) 
Family Glycymerididae Dall, 1908 
Glycymeris glycymeris (Linnaeus, 1758) 
Family Noetiidae Steward, 1930 
Striarca lactea (Linnaeus, 1758) Possible

Superfamily Limopsoidea Dall, 1895

Family Limopsidae Dall, 1895 
Limopsis aurita (Brocchi, 1814) 
Limopsis cristata Jeffreys, 1876 
Limopsis minuta (Philippi, 1836) 
Limopsis tenella Jeffreys, 1876

Order Mytiloida Férussac, 1822

Superfamily Mytiloidea Rafinesque, 1815

Family Mytilidae Rafinesque, 1815 
Crenella decussata (Montagu, 1808) 
Dacrydium ockelmanni Mattson & Warén, 1977 
Gibbomodiola adriatica (Lamarck, 1819) 
Idas argenteus Jeffreys, 1876 
Idas simpsoni (Marshall, 1900) 
Musculus subpictus (Cantraine, 1835) 
Modiolula phaseolina (Philippi, 1844) 
Modiolus barbatus (Linnaeus, 1758) 
Modiolus modiolus (Linnaeus, 1758) 
Musculus costulatus (Risso, 1826) 
Musculus discors (Linnaeus, 1767) 
Musculus niger (J E Gray, 1824) 
Mytilus edulis Linnaeus, 1758 
Mytilus galloprovincialis Lamarck, 1818

Order Pterioida Newell, 1965

Superfamily Pterioidea J. E. Clay, 1847 [1820]

Family Pteriidae J. E. Gray, 1847 [1820] 
Pinctada imbricata Roding, 1798  1 shell in a bait pot, Loher Beach, Waterville, Co Kerry.
Pteria hirundo (Linnaeus, 1758)

Superfamily Ostreoidea Rafinesque, 1815

Family Ostreidae Rafinesque, 1815 
Crassostrea gigas (Thunberg, 1793) 
Ostrea edulis Linnaeus, 1758 
Dendrostrea frons (Linnaeus, 1758) Loher Beach, Waterville, Co. Kerry (2013), Cross Beach, Mullet Peninsula, Co. Mayo
Family Gryphaeidae Vyalov, 1936 
Neopycnodonte cochlear (Poli, 1795) 
Superfamily Pinnoidea Leach, 1819

Family Pinnidae Leach, 1819 
Atrina fragilis (Linnaeus, 1758)

Order Limoida Waller, 1978

Superfamily Limoidea d'Orbigny, 1846

Family Limidae d'Orbigny, 1846 
Acesta excavata (J C Fabricius, 1779) 
Limaria hians (Gmelin, 1791) 
Limatula bisecta Allen, 2004 Known only from the type locality at the continental margin of the Porcupine Bight.
Limatula celtica Allen, 2004 Biscay Basin
Limatula gwyni (Sykes, 1903) 	
Limatula jeffreysi (P Fischer, 1882) Biscay Basin
Limatula margaretae Allen, 2004 known only from the type locality in the Biscay Basin at abyssal depths.
Limatula subauriculata (Montagu, 1808) 
Limatula subovata (Monterosato, 1875)

Order Pectinoida H. Adams & A. Adams, 1857

Superfamily Pectinoidea Rafinesque, 1815

Family Pectinidae Rafinesque, 1815 
Aequipecten opercularis (Linnaeus, 1758) 
Mimachlamys varia (Linnaeus, 1758) 
Chlamys varia (Linnaeus, 1758) 
Talochlamys pusio (Linnaeus, 1758) 
Delectopecten vitreus (Gmelin, 1791) 
Hyalopecten pudicus (E A Smith, 1885) 
Palliolum incomparabile (Risso, 1826) 
Palliolum striatum (Müller, 1776) 
Palliolum tigerinum (Müller, 1776) 
Pecten maximus (Linnaeus, 1758) 
Pseudamussium peslutrae (Linnaeus, 1771) 
Karnekampia sulcata  (Müller, 1776) 
Family Propeamussiidae Abbott, 1954 
Catillopecten eucymatus (Dall 1898) 
Cyclopecten ambiannulatus Schein, 1989 Porcupine Sea Bight, Bay of Biscay 
Cyclopecten hoskynsi (Forbes, 1844) 
Parvamussium permirum  (Dautzenberg, 1925) Porcupine Sea Bight
Propeamussium lucidum (Jeffreys in Thomson, 1873) 
Similipecten oskarssoni Dijkstra & Warén, 2009 
Similipecten similis (Laskey, 1811)
 
Superfamily Anomioidea Rafinesque, 1815

Family Anomiidae Rafinesque, 1815 
Anomia ephippium Linnaeus, 1758 
Heteranomia squamula (Linnaeus, 1758) 
Pododesmus squama (Gmelin, 1791)

SUBCLASS HETEROCONCHIA  Hertwig, 1895
HETERODONTA Neumayr, 1883

Order Carditoida Dall, 1889

Superfamily Crassatelloidea Ferussac, 1822

Family Astartidae d'Orbigny, 1844
Astarte acuticostata Friele, 1877 
Astarte elliptica (Brown, 1827) 
Astarte montagui (Dillwyn, 1817) 
Astarte sulcata (da Costa, 1778) 
Goodallia triangularis (Montagu, 1803)

Superfamily Thyasiroidea Dall, 1900

Family Thyasiridae Dall, 1900
Adontorhina keegani Barry & McCormack 2007 Known only from Porcupine Bank, West of Ireland
Adontorhina similis Barry & McCormack 2007 
Genaxinus eumyarius  (M Sars, 1870) 
Axinulus brevis (Verrill & Bush, 1898) 
Axinulus croulinensis (Jeffreys, 1847) 
Axinus grandis (Verrill & Smith 1885) Bay of Biscay and Rockall Trough
Leptaxinus incrassatus (Jeffreys, 1876) Rosemary Bank and south to Bay of Biscay
Mendicula ferruginosa (Forbes, 1844) 
Parathyasira subcircularis Payne & Allen, 1991 Atlantic margin.
Thyasira flexuosa (Montagu, 1803) 
Thyasira scotiae Oliver & Drewery, 2014 Hatton-Rockall Basin.
Thyasira subovata (Jeffreys, 1881)  Rockall Trough
Thyasira succisa (Jeffreys, 1876) 
Thyasira tortuosa (Jeffreys, 1881)

Order Anomalodesmata Dall, 1889

Superfamily Pandoroidea Rafinesque, 1815

Family Pandoridae Rafinesque, 1815
Pandora inaequivalvis (Linnaeus, 1758) 
Pandora pinna (Montagu, 1803) 
Family Lyonsiidae P. Fischer, 1887
Allogramma formosa (Jeffreys, 1882)
Lyonsia norwegica (Gmelin, 1791)

Superfamily Thracioidea Stoliczka, 1870

Family Periplomatidae Dall, 1895
Cochlodesma praetenue (Pulteney, 1799) 
Cochlodesma tenerum Fischer, 1882 Rockall Trough.
Family Thraciidae Stoliczka, 1870
Thracia convexa (W Wood, 1815) 
Thracia distorta (Montagu, 1803) 
Thracia phaseolina (Lamarck, 1818) 
Thracia pubescens (Pulteney, 1799) 
Thracia villosiuscula (Macgillivray, 1827)

SUBCLASS SEPTIBRANCHIA Pelseneer, 1888

Superfamily Verticordioidea Stoliczka, 1871

Family Verticordiidae Stoliczka, 1870
Halicardia flexuosa (Verrill & Smith, 1881)  bathyal and abyssal 
Lyonsiella abyssicola G O Sars, 1872 bathyal and abyssal 
Lyonsiella subquadrata (Jeffreys, 1882) 
Policordia atlantica Allen & Turner, 1974 Porcupine Sea Bight
Policordia gemma (Verrill, 1880) 
Spinosipella acuticostata (Philippia, 1844) Porcupine sea bank and margins of the Bay of Biscay
Verticordia triangularis (Locard, 1898) abyssal 
Family Poromyidae Dall, 1886
Cetoconcha bulla (Dall, 1881) Porcupine
Poromya granulata (Nyst & Westendorp, 1839) 
Cetomya tornata (Jeffreys, 1876) Porcupine Sea Bight
Family Cuspidariidae Dall, 1886
Cardiomya cadiziana Huber, 2010  Biscay Basin 
Cardiomya costellata (Deshayes, 1835) 
Cardiomya knudseni Allen & Morgan, 1981 Porcupine Sea Bight
Cardiomya striata (Jeffreys, 1876) bathyal
Cuspidaria cuspidata (Olivi, 1792) 
Cuspidaria lamellosa (G O Sars, 1872) Atlantic margin
Cuspidaria obesa (Lovén, 1846) 
Cuspidaria parva Verrill & Bush, 1898 Rockall Trough and Biscay Basin
Cuspidaria rostrata (Spengler, 1793) 
Cuspidaria undata Verrill, 1884 Porcupine
Halonympha inflata (Jeffreys, 1882) Known only from the original Porcupine material collected in the Biscay Basin
Myonera alleni Poutiers & Bernard, 1995 Bay of Biscay, Porcupine Sea Bight and Rockall Trough
Myonera demistriata Allen & Morgan, 1981 Rockall Trough 
Myonera sulcifera (Jeffreys, 1882) Porcupine
Pseudoneara truncata Jeffreys, 1882  Biscay 
Protocuspidaria atlantica Allen & Morgan, 1981 Porcupine Sea Bight and Biscay.
Protocuspidaria simplis Allen & Morgan, 1981 Porcupine Sea Bight
Rhinoclama notabilis (Jeffreys, 1876) abyssal 
Tropidomya abbreviata (Forbes, 1843)

Order Veneroida H. Adams & A. Adams, 1856

Superfamily Lucinoidea Fleming, 1828

Family Lucinidae Fleming, 1828
Loripes lucinalis (Lamarck, 1818) 
Lucinella divaricata (Linnaeus, 1758) 
Lucinoma borealis (Linnaeus, 1758) 
Myrtea spinifera (Montagu, 1803)

Superfamily Galeommatoidea J. E. Gray, 1840

Family Basterotiidae Cossman, 1909
Atopomya dolobrata Oliver 2013  Wyville-Thomson Ridge and from the Porcupine Sea Bight
Family Lasaeidae J. E. Gray, 1842 
Lasaea adansoni (Gmelin, 1791) 
Family Leptonidae J. E. Gray, 1847
Lepton squamosum (Montagu, 1803) 
Family Kelliidae Forbes & Hanley, 1849
Kellia suborbicularis (Montagu, 1803) 
Hemilepton nitidum (Turton, 1822) 
Family Montacutidae W. Clark, 1855
Coracuta obliquata (Chaster, 1897) 
Devonia perrieri (Malard, 1904) 
Draculamya porobranchiata Oliver & Lutzen, 2011 bathyal 
Epilepton clarkiae (Clark, 1852) 
Kurtiella bidentata (Montagu, 1803) 
Kurtiella tumidula (Jeffreys, 1866) 
Montacuta substriata (Montagu, 1808) 
Scacchia tenera Jeffreys, 1881 bathyal and abyssal
Syssitomya pourtalesiana Oliver, 2012 
Tellimya ferruginosa Montagu, 1808

Superfamily Hiatelloidea J. E. Gray, 1824

Family Hiatellidae J. E. Gray, 1824
Hiatella arctica (Linnaeus, 1758) 
Hiatella rugosa (Linnaeus, 1767) 
Saxicavella jeffreysi Winckworth, 1930

Superfamily Gastrochaenoidea J. E. Gray, 1840

Family Gastrochaenidae J. E. Gray, 1840
Rocellaria dubia (Pennant, 1777)

Superfamily Arcticoidea R. B. Newton, 1891

Family Arcticidae R. B. Newton, 1891
Arctica islandica (Linnaeus, 1767)

Superfamily Ungulinoidea H. Adams & A. Adams

Family Ungulinidae H. Adams & A. Adams
Diplodonta rotundata (Montagu, 1803)

Superfamily Glossoidea J. E. Gray, 1847 [1840]

Family Glossidae J. E. Gray, 1847 [1840]
Glossus humanus (Linnaeus, 1758)
Family Kelliellidae P. Fischer, 1887
Kelliella miliaris (Philippi, 1844) 
Family Vesicomyidae Dall & Simpson, 190
Vesicomya atlantica (E A Smith, 1885) bathyal and abyssal 
Isorropodon mackayi Oliver & Drewery, 2014 Known only from a single location in the Hatton-Rockall Basin.

Superfamily Cardioidea Lamarck, 1809

Family Cardiidae Lamarck, 1809
Acanthocardia echinata (Linnaeus, 1758) 
Acanthocardia tuberculata (Linnaeus, 1758) 
Cerastoderma edule (Linnaeus, 1758) 
Cerastoderma glaucum (Bruguière, 1789) 
Laevicardium crassum (Gmelin, 1791) 
Parvicardium exiguum (Gmelin, 1791) 
Parvicardium minimum (Philippi, 1836) 
Parvicardium pinnulatum (Conrad, 1831) 
Parvicardium scabrum (Philippi, 1844)
 
Superfamily Veneroidea Rafinesque, 1815

Family Veneridae Rafinesque, 1815
Chamelea striatula (da Costa, 1778) 
Clausinella fasciata (da Costa, 1778) 
Dosinia exoleta (Linnaeus, 1758) 
Dosinia lupinus (Linnaeus, 1758) 
Gouldia minima  (Montagu, 1803) 
Irus irus  (Linnaeus, 1758) 
Tapes aureus  (Gmelin, 1791) 
Tapes corrugata  (Gmelin, 1791) 
Tapes decussatus  (Linnaeus, 1758) 
Tapes rhomboides  (Pennant, 1777) 
Timoclea ovata  (Pennant, 1777) 
Venus casina  Linnaeus, 1758 
Venus verrucosa  Linnaeus, 1758 
Family Petricolidae Deshayes, 1831
Mysia undata  (Pennant, 1777) 
Family Turtoniidae Clark 1855
Turtonia minuta  (Fabricius, 1780) 
Family Neoleptonidae Thiele, 1934
Arculus sykesi  (Chaster, 1895) 
Neolepton sulcatulum  (Jeffreys, 1859)
 
Superfamily Tellinoidea Blainville, 1814

Family Tellinidae Blainville, 1814
Arcopagia crassa  (Pennant, 1777) 
Arcopella balaustina  (Linnaeus, 1758) 
Gastrana fragilis  (Linnaeus, 1758) 
Macoma balthica  (Linnaeus, 1758) 
Tellina fabula  Gmelin, 1791 
Tellina incarnata  Linnaeus, 1758 
Tellina donacina  Linnaeus, 1758 
Tellina pygmaea  Lovén, 1846 
Tellina tenuis  da Costa, 1778 
Family Donacidae J. Fleming, 1828
Donax variegata   (Gmelin, 1791)  
Donax vittatus  (da Costa, 1778) 
Family Psammobiidae J. Fleming, 1828
Gari costulata  (Turton, 1822) 
Gari depressa  (Pennant, 1777) 
Gari fervensis  (Gmelin, 1791) 
Gari tellinella  (Lamarck, 1818) 
Family Semelidae Stoliczka, 1870
Abra alba  (W Wood, 1802) 
Abra longicallus  (Scacchi, 1835) 
Abra nitida  (Müller, 1776) 
Abra prismatica  (Montagu, 1808) 
Abra profundorum  (E A Smith, 1885) abyssal
Abra tenuis  (Montagu, 1803) 
Ervilia castanea  (Montagu, 1803) 
Scrobicularia plana  (da Costa, 1778) 
Family Solecurtidae d'Orbigny, 1846
Azorinus chamasolen  (da Costa, 1778) 
Solecurtus candidus  (Brocchi, 1814) 
Solecurtus scopula  (Turton, 1822)

Superfamily Solenoidea Lamarck, 1809

Family Solenidae Lamarck, 1809
Solen marginatus  Pulteney, 1799 
Family Pharidae H. Adams & A. Adams, 1856
Ensis magnus  (Schumacher, 1817) 
Ensis ensis  (Linnaeus, 1758)  
Ensis siliqua  (Linnaeus, 1758) 
Pharus legumen  (Linnaeus, 1758) 
Phaxas pellucidus  (Pennant, 1777)

Superfamily Mactroidea Lamarck, 1809

Family Mactridae Lamarck, 1809
Lutraria angustior  Philippi, 1844 
Lutraria lutraria  (Linnaeus, 1758) 
Lutraria magna  (da Costa, 1778) 
Mactra stultorum  (Linnaeus, 1758) 
Spisula elliptica  (Brown, 1827) 
Spisula solida  (Linnaeus, 1758) 
Spisula subtruncata  (da Costa, 1778)

Order Myoida Stoliczka, 1870

Superfamily Myoidea Lamarck, 1809

Family Myidae Lamarck, 1809
Mya arenaria  Linnaeus, 1758 
Mya truncata  Linnaeus, 1758 
Sphenia binghami  Turton, 1822 
Family Corbulidae Lamarck, 1818
Corbula gibba  (Olivi, 1792)

Superfamily Pholadoidea Lamarck, 1809

Family Pholadidae Lamarck, 1809
Barnea candida  (Linnaeus, 1758) 
Barnea parva  (Pennant, 1777) 
Martesia striata  (Linnaeus, 1758) 
Pholadidea loscombiana  Turton, 1819 
Pholas dactylus  Linnaeus, 1758 
Zirfaea crispata  (Linnaeus, 1758) 
Family Teredinidae Rafinesque, 1815
Bankia bipennata  (Turton, 1819) 
Bankia gouldi  (Bartsch, 1908) 
Nototeredo norvagica  (Spengler, 1792) 
Psiloteredo megotara  (Hanley in Forbes & Hanley, 1848) 
Teredo navalis  Linnaeus, 1758 
Teredora malleolus  (Turton, 1822) 
Uperotus lieberkindi  (Roch, 1931) 
Family Xylophagaidae 1941
Xylophaga dorsalis  (Turton, 1819) 
Xylophaga gagei  Harvey, 1996

References
J.D. Nunn and J.M.C. Holmes A catalogue of the Irish and British marine Mollusca in the collections of the National Museum of Ireland ~ Natural History, 1835-2008
P. J. Hayward and J. S. Ryland Eds., 1999 The Marine Fauna of the British Isles and North-West Europe: Volume II: Molluscs to Chordates Oxford University Press 
Howson, C.M. & Picton, B.E.(eds) 1997. The species directory of the marine fauna and flora of the British Isles and surrounding seas.Ulster Museum and The Marine Conservation Society, Belfast and Ross-on-Wye. Also as CD ROM
Poppe, Guido T. & Goto, Yoshihiro. 1991-3. European seashells. Verlag Christa Hemmen

External links
 Marine bivalve Mollusca of the British Isles
Bernard E. Picton and Christine C. Morrow Encyclopedia of Marine Life of Britain and Ireland
 MarLIN Marine Life Information Network for Britain and Ireland.
 Roche C., Clarke S. & O’Connor B. (2005) Inventory of Irish marine wildlife publications. Irish Wildlife Manuals, No. 16. National Parks and Wildlife Service,Department of Environment, Heritage and Local Government, Dublin, Ireland.
 Gofas, S.; Le Renard, J.; Bouchet, P. (2001). Mollusca, in: Costello, M.J. et al. (Ed.) (2001). European register of marine species: a check-list of the marine species in Europe and a bibliography of guides to their identification. Collection Patrimoines Naturels, 50: pp. 180–213
Marine species identification portal
Natural History Museum Rotterdam Mollusca Images

See also
Littoral
Mesopelagic
Oceanic
Benthic
Deep ocean water
Deep sea

Fauna of Ireland